The Cove is a historic plantation house located at Harrisburg, Halifax County, Virginia. The main house was built about 1773, and is a -story, vernacular frame dwelling with a gable roof and flanking stone chimneys. Also on the property are the contributing two secondary dwellings, a hay barn, and two log tobacco barns (one of which has been converted to a dwelling); and sites including the ruins of four log barns, three chimneys, an ice house, a frame barn, a frame shed, a log house, and what are believed to be at least two slave quarters and an archeological site.

It was listed on the National Register of Historic Places in 2006.

References

Plantation houses in Virginia
Houses on the National Register of Historic Places in Virginia
Archaeological sites on the National Register of Historic Places in Virginia
Houses completed in 1773
Houses in Halifax County, Virginia
National Register of Historic Places in Halifax County, Virginia
Slave cabins and quarters in the United States